Clydesdale was a county constituency represented in the House of Commons of the Parliament of the United Kingdom from 1983 until 2005. In the latter year, as part of a major reorganisation of Scottish constituencies, it was redistributed to Dumfriesshire, Clydesdale and Tweeddale, Lanark and Hamilton East and East Kilbride, Strathaven and Lesmahagow.

The similarly named Scottish Parliament constituency of Clydesdale continues in existence.

Boundaries
Clydesdale District, and the Hamilton District electoral division of Larkhall and Stonehouse.

Members of Parliament

Elections

Elections of the 1980s

Elections of the 1990s

Elections of the 2000s

References

Historic parliamentary constituencies in Scotland (Westminster)
Constituencies of the Parliament of the United Kingdom established in 1983
Constituencies of the Parliament of the United Kingdom disestablished in 2005
Politics of South Lanarkshire
Clydesdale